Sandy Mouche is a Swedish band from Lund, Skåne County, southern Sweden.  It consists of songwriter- and singer couple Martinique and Helena Josefsson, and the brothers Per (drums) and Ola (guitar) Blomgren.  On live shows they bring a bassist and a pianist.  They sing in English and French.

History

Formation
Sandy Mouche was created in autumn 2001. Helena and Martinique were on holiday in Crete, Greece, with Per (who had played with Helena in other bands for six years) and his girlfriend, Hanna. Martinique played his song, "A Year" for the group. It was then that they collectively decided to form a band.

The E.P. (2003) and White Lucky Dragon (2004)
The band recorded demos in Per's bedroom, and in a studio along with Danyal Taylan, who would play the bass from then point until 2004.  Sandy Mouche recorded and released an EP, which they sent to producer Christoffer Lundquist, whom the band felt to be "the perfect collaborator".  Sandy Mouche decided they would release their first album, White Lucky Dragon (2004) on their own label, Magpie Music. White Lucky Dragon was released in Sweden and Japan.

... and poems for the unborn (2006)
...and poems for the unborn was released in 2006.  The album was self-financed, with Playground Music Scandinavia and Junk Music handling the distribution. It was recorded and mixed over a 10-day period. Unlike the first album, the songwriters wrote separately for their second album, which resulted in a more diverse release than their debut, counting ABBA, jazz, disco, pop, and even children's music among its influences. According to the band, they made the kind of album they would like to buy themselves.

Writing in Östersunds-Posten David Stark described the album as "very fragmented" and "sadly packaged" while a review in Smålandsposten described the album as "easy to digest and easy to forget".  Svenska Dagbladet were more positive, with a review by Dan Backman describing the album as "romantic, whimsical soft rock".

Glory and grace (2013)
For several years after 2006 the band members mostly worked on solo projects.  Helena Josefsson released two solo albums, and toured with Roxette.  The band members also had several children, and struggled to find time for Sandy Mouche.  However, after Per Blomgren constructed his own studio the group met to work together on songs.  In 2013 they released Glory and grace.

Since 2013
 the band was largely inactive.

Critical reception
In a scathing 2007 review of one of Helena Josefsson's solo albums, Göteborgs-Posten described Sandy Mouche as "a pop band, annoying in every way" and "the worst thing to come out of Scania since spettekaka".

Discography and videography

Albums
 Sandy Mouche (2003) - ep
 White Lucky Dragon (2004) - just in Sweden and Japan
 ...and poems for the unborn (2006) - in Sweden, Belgium and Australia
 Glory and grace (2013)

Singles
 Cherry pie (2003) - promo
 C'est pas juste (2004) - promo
 Papillon (2004) - promo
 Une histoire (2005)
 In the sand (2005)
 Spiderweb suit (2005)
 Papillon (2006) - Promo in France
 Evening Wake, Morning Flake (December, 2006) - Radio in Belgium.

Videography
 Cherry pie (dir. Johan Tholsson)
 C’est pas juste (dir. Per and Ola Blomgren)
 Papillon (dir. Jeffry Rich)

References

External links
 Official site for Sandy Mouche
 Le Journal des Mouches - News about Helena, Sandy Mouche and Son of a Plumber
 
 
 
 

Swedish musical groups
Swedish pop singers